The 2014–15 Big Ten men's basketball season began with practices in October 2014, followed by the start of the 2014–15 NCAA Division I men's basketball season in November. It marked the first season for Rutgers and Maryland in the Big Ten Conference. Wisconsin won the regular season title and the 2015 Big Ten Conference men's basketball tournament.

Following the season, eight teams participated in post-season tournaments. Seven teams were invited to participate in the 2015 NCAA Men's Division I Basketball Tournament, and one team was selected for the 2015 National Invitation Tournament. The conference achieved a 12–7 record in the NCAA tournament and a 12–8 overall postseason record. The postseason was highlighted by Wisconsin's NCAA tournament championship game appearance and Michigan State's final four appearance.

Frank Kaminsky earned several national player of the year awards and was the Big Ten Conference Men's Basketball Player of the Year. He and D'Angelo Russell received 2014 All-American first team recognition and Melo Trimble earned second team recognition. Russell and Trimble were both 2015 USBWA Freshman All-America Team selections. Kaminsky and Russell were the inaugural Kareem Abdul-Jabbar Award and Jerry West Award winners, respectively. Shavon Shields and Mike Gesell were Academic All-America selections.

Following the season, the conference had 5 selections in the 2015 NBA draft, including 3 in the first round: Russell (2nd), Kaminsky (9th), Sam Dekker (18th), Aaron White (49th), and Branden Dawson (56th). International player, Caleb Swanigan won a gold medal with Team USA at the 2015 FIBA Under-19 World Championship, while Trimble and Denzel Valentine won bronze medals at the 2015 Pan American Games.

Preseason
According to the Big Ten media, Frank Kaminsky was the preseason conference player of the year and he was joined on the All-Big Ten preseason team by Yogi Ferrell, Caris LeVert, Terran Petteway, and Sam Dekker. The Big Ten Network poll came to the same results.

When CBSSports.com named its Preseason All-American team, it included LeVert, Petteway, Kaminsky and Dekker to its second team. NBCSports.com selected LeVert and Dekker to its Preseason All-American first team, Kaminsky to its second team and named Petteway as an honorable mention. Kaminsky was also a Preseason All-American first team selection by the Associated Press. Sporting News included Branden Dawson (1st team), Petteway and Dekker (2nd team), and Kaminsky (3rd team). USA Today selected Dekker to its first team, Dawson to its second team and Kaminsky, LeVert and Petteway to its third team. SB Nation included Kaminsky on its first team, Dekker and LeVert on its second team and Petteway on its third team. Sports Illustrated included Kaminsky on its first team and selected Dekker and LeVert to its second team. Bleacher Report selected Kaminsky and Petteway to its first team and LeVert and Dekker to its second team. Athlon Sports selected Dekker to its first team, LeVert and Kaminsky to its second team and Petteway to its third team. Blue Ribbon College Basketball Yearbook selected Kaminsky as its preseason National Player of the Year and to its first team, while selecting Dekker and LeVert to its second team.

Preseason watchlists
Below is a table of notable preseason watch lists.

Derrick Walton, Ferrell and Melo Trimble were among the 36 athletes on the Bob Cousy Award Preseason Watch List. LeVert, Dawson, Petteway, Dekker and Kaminsky were named to the Lute Olson Award Preseason Watch List. The Oscar Robertson Trophy Watch List included LeVert, Dawson, Petteway, Dekker and Kaminsky. James Blackmon, Jr., Robert Johnson, and D'Angelo Russell made the Wayman Tisdale Award Watch List.

Dawson, Dekker, Ferrell, Kaminsky, LeVert, Petteway and Dez Wells all made the Wooden Award Preseason Top 50 list. When the Naismith Award Top 50 list came out in early December, it included Dawson, Dekker, Ferrell, Kaminsky, LeVert, Petteway and Russell.

Preseason polls

Wisconsin was selected as the unanimous preseason favorite to win the conference championship by the members of the Big Ten Media. Michigan State and Ohio State were predicted to finish second and third in the same poll. The Big Ten Network poll had Wisconsin followed by Ohio State and Michigan State.

Several Preseason polls included Big Ten Teams.

Conference schedules
Before the season, it was announced that all 126 conference games would be broadcast nationally by CBS Sports, ESPN Inc. family of networks including ESPN, ESPN2 and ESPNU, and the Big Ten Network. ESPN scheduled a game for every Tuesday and Thursday night of the conference season and CBS scheduled games for Saturday or Sunday afternoons starting January 17, 2015. CBS will carry the semifinals and finals of the 2015 Big Ten Conference men's basketball tournament, marking the 18th consecutive year that they have covered the Big Ten Conference men's basketball tournament. Following the season, the Big Ten was announced as the national attendance leader for the 39th consecutive season with an average attendance of 12,781 for regular season home games and all seven sessions of the Big Ten Men's Basketball Tournament.

Rankings

The Big Ten had 6 teams ranked and 2 others receiving votes in the preseason Coaches' Poll and 5 teams ranked and 4 others receiving votes in the preseason AP Poll.

Player of the week
Throughout the conference regular season, the Big Ten offices named one or two players of the week and one or two freshmen of the week each Monday.

On December 23, 2014, Troy Williams was named Oscar Robertson National Player of the Week by the United States Basketball Writers Association. On January 13, Travis Trice earned Oscar Robertson National Player of the Week recognition. On both January 27 and February 10, D'Angelo Russell was named Wayman Tisdale National Freshman of the Week. On the 27th, he was also named Oscar Robertson National Player of the Week.

Watchlists
Ferrell, Kaminsky, Trimble and Russell made the John R. Wooden Award Midseason Top 25 list on January 14. On January 23, Dekker, Kaminsky and Trimble were named to the 17-man 2015 Oscar Robertson Trophy Midseason Watch List and Blackmon, Russell and Trimble were named to the 14-man 2015 Integris Wayman Tisdale Award Midseason Watch List. On that same day, Newbill and Kaminsky were named to the 30-man 2014–15 Senior CLASS Award Candidates. In February, Newbill and Kaminsky advanced to among the 10 finalists for the Senior CLASS Award. Kaminsky and Russell were both named to the Naismith Trophy Award Midseason Top 30 Watch List. Colby Wollenman (Michigan State), Mike Gesell and Jarrod Uthoff (Iowa) and Shavon Shields (Nebraska) all made their respective Academic All-District teams on February 5, placing them among the 40 finalists for the 15 man Academic All-American team to be announced on February 28. The following players were finalists for positional awards: Bob Cousy Award: Ferrell and Trimble; Julius Erving Award: Dawson and Denzel Valentine, Petteway and Dekker; Karl Malone Award: Aaron White and Jake Layman; Jerry West Award: Blackmon and Russell; Kareem Abdul-Jabbar Award: Kaminsky. On March 2, Kaminsky and Russell were named to the 14-man 2015 Oscar Robertson Trophy Finalist List and Blackmon, Russell and Trimble were named to the 2015 10-man Integris Wayman Tisdale Award Finalist List.

Honors and awards
Kaminsky won numerous national player of the year awards, including NABC Player of the Year, Oscar Robertson Trophy, Naismith College Player of the Year, John R. Wooden Award, and Associated Press College Basketball Player of the Year.

The United States Basketball Writers Association named Michigan's Austin Hatch as its recipient for the U.S. Basketball Writers Association's Most Courageous Award for 2015. The College Sports Information Directors of America selected Shavon Shields of Nebraska and Mike Gesell of Iowa to its Capital One Academic All-America first and third teams, respectively. Both Russell and Trimble were named to the 2015 USBWA Freshman All-America Team by the United States Basketball Writers Association.

Conference players received lots of recognition as 2015 NCAA Men's Basketball All-Americans: Kaminsky and Russell were both first-team selections by The Sporting News, while Trimble was a second team choice. Kaminsky and Russell were first team selections by the United States Basketball Writers Association (USBWA). Kaminsky and Russell were the inaugural winners of the Kareem Abdul-Jabbar Award and Jerry West Award. Colby Wollenman won the Elite 89 Award.

All-Big Ten Awards and Teams
On March 9, The Big Ten announced most of its conference awards.

NABC
The National Association of Basketball Coaches announced their Division I All-District teams on March 27, recognizing the nation's best men's collegiate basketball student-athletes. Selected and voted on by member coaches of the NABC, the selections on this list were then eligible for NABC Coaches' All-America Honors. The following list represented the District 7 players chosen to the list.

First Team
Frank Kaminsky Wisconsin
D'Angelo Russell Ohio State
Yogi Ferrell Indiana
Melo Trimble Maryland
A. J. Hammons Purdue

Second Team
Sam Dekker Wisconsin
D. J. Newbill Penn State
Aaron White Iowa
Dez Wells Maryland
Branden Dawson Michigan State

USBWA
On March 10, the U.S. Basketball Writers Association released its 2014–15 Men's All-District Teams, based upon voting from its national membership. There were nine regions from coast to coast, and a player and coach of the year were selected in each. The following lists all the Big Ten representatives selected within their respective regions.

District II (NY, NJ, DE, DC, PA, WV)
D. J. Newbill, Penn State

District III (VA, NC, SC, MD)
Melo Trimble, Maryland
Dez Wells, Maryland

District V (OH, IN, IL, MI, MN, WI)
Player of the Year
Frank Kaminsky, Wisconsin
Coach of the Year
Bo Ryan, Wisconsin
All-District Team
Branden Dawson, Michigan State
Sam Dekker, Wisconsin
Yogi Ferrell, Indiana
A. J. Hammons, Purdue
Frank Kaminsky, Wisconsin
D'Angelo Russell, Ohio State
Denzel Valentine, Michigan State

District VI (IA, MO, KS, OK, NE, ND, SD)
Aaron White, Iowa

Postseason

Big Ten tournament

  March 11–15, 2015 Big Ten Conference men's basketball tournament, United Center, Chicago.

NCAA tournament

The Big Ten Conference had seven bids to the 2015 NCAA Men's Division I Basketball Tournament. Michigan State and Wisconsin both reached the final four, with Wisconsin losing to Duke in the Championship Game.

National Invitation tournament 

Illinois earned the lone NIT bid for the conference.

2015 NBA draft

The following all-conference selections were listed as seniors: Frank Kaminsky, Aaron White, Dez Wells, D. J. Newbill, Branden Dawson, and Travis Trice. Sam Dekker, Terran Petteway, Walter Pitchford, and D'Angelo Russell declared early for the NBA draft before the April 26 deadline, but had until June 15 to withdraw their names. On May 7, Dekker, Dawson, Kaminsky, White, Wells, Pettaway, and Russell were invited to the NBA Draft combine. Russell, Kaminsky, Dekkar, White and Dawson were drafted.

International play
On June 18, 2015 incoming Purdue commit Caleb Swanigan was announced as a member of the 12-man 2015 USA Basketball Men's U19 World Championship Team for the 2015 FIBA Under-19 World Championship. The team won the gold medal. Issac Haas (Purdue), Nigel Hayes (Wisconsin), Malcolm Hill (Illinois), Romelo Trimble (Maryland); Denzel Valentine (Michigan State) were among the 22 players selected to try out for the 12-man Team USA at the 2015 Pan American Games. Hayes Trimble and Valentine were among the 16 finalists for the team. Trimble and Valentine made the final 12-man team. The team earned the bronze medal.

Notes